Krahës is a village in Gjirokastër County, southern Albania. It formerly functioned as a municipality, but at the 2015 local government reform, it became a subdivision of the municipality Memaliaj.

Its population at the 2011 census was 2,554.

Etymology

The etymology of Krahes is in Albanian, as it derives from the word Krah (Albanian for arm).

References

Former municipalities in Gjirokastër County
Administrative units of Memaliaj
Villages in Gjirokastër County